Florence O'Mahony (born 23 January 1946) is a former Labour Party politician in Ireland. He was a senator in the 1980s, and was a Member of the European Parliament (MEP).

He later came to prominence as a lobbyist and publicist for the tobacco industry.

Political career
From 1973 to 1977 O'Mahony was a policy advisor to the Tánaiste and Minister for Health, Labour Party leader Brendan Corish. When Labour returned to opposition after the 1977 general election he continued as an advisor to Corish's successor, Frank Cluskey.

O'Mahony had himself stood unsuccessfully as a Labour candidate at the 1969 and 1973 general elections in the Dún Laoghaire and Rathdown constituency. He stood in Dublin North-Central at the November 1982 and 1987 general elections, and in Dún Laoghaire at the 1989 general election, but never won a seat in Dáil Éireann.

However, in 1981 he was elected on the Administrative Panel to the 15th Seanad, and was re-elected twice, serving until the dissolution of the 17th Seanad in 1987. In March 1983 he was appointed as a Member of the European Parliament, filling the vacancy caused by the resignation of John Horgan. However, he did not contest the 1984 European election, in which Labour lost the seats in the European Parliament which it had won in the 1979 election.

Lobbyist
After leaving politics, O'Mahony became a public affairs consultant in 1989. He is also an Associate Lecturer in European Studies at the Institute of Public Administration in Dublin.

O'Mahony later became known as the "public face" of the Irish Tobacco Manufacturers Advisory Committee (ITMAC), of which he was director and which shared an office in Dublin with O'Mahony's company CIPA; in 1992 O'Mahony's name was recorded as the donor of IR£3,000 donated to the Progressive Democrats on behalf of ITMAC. As a lobbyist against plans for legislation to protect workers against passive smoking, O'Mahony was named in 1999 as having been involved in lobbying by ITMAC which Dr Fenton Howell, vice-president of the Irish Medical Organisation, claimed "secretly manipulated and misled a group advising the minister for health on new smoking regulations". O'Mahony subsequently told the Joint Oireachtas Committee on Health and Children that he could not remember who gave him information about a meeting of a Department of Health working group which had allowed him to circulate a report of the meeting to tobacco companies within 24 hours of the meeting. After hearing O'Mahony's evidence, the chairman Batt O'Keeffe told Mahony that some of the points made about his conduct were "well-founded", and recommended that "in future deliberations he would be conscious of the public interest and people's health". Howell told a sub-committee in 2001 that O'Mahony had been "less than candid in his replies" to the committee.

O'Mahony was one of three former senior officials of the Irish Labour Party reported to have had ties with the tobacco industry.

References

External links

Flor O'Mahony profile on the Finsbury International Policy & Regulatory Advisers website

1946 births
Living people
Labour Party (Ireland) senators
Members of the 15th Seanad
Members of the 16th Seanad
Members of the 17th Seanad
Irish lobbyists
Labour Party (Ireland) MEPs
MEPs for the Republic of Ireland 1979–1984